Chinese(-)Kenyan or Kenyan(-)Chinese may refer to:
People's Republic of China–Kenya relations (c.f. a "Chinese–Kenyan treaty)
Chinese people in Kenya
Kenyans in China
People with dual citizenship of China and Kenya
Afro-Asian people of mixed Chinese and Kenyan descent